Charles Addison Mann (January 16, 1803 Fairfield, Herkimer County, New York – January 19, 1860 Utica, Oneida County, New York) was an American lawyer and politician from New York.

Life
He was the son of Abijah Mann (1761–1856) and Levina (Ford) Mann (1768–1813).

He married Emma Bagg (1813–1887), and removed to Utica, his wife's hometown. They had several children, among them Dr. Matthew Derbyshire Mann (1845–1921) who was one of the physicians who treated President William McKinley after he was shot in 1901.

He was a member of the New York State Assembly (Oneida Co.) in 1840.

He was a member of the New York State Senate (19th D.) in 1850 and 1851. He was among the 12 state senators who resigned on April 17, 1851, to prevent a quorum in the Senate.

Congressman Abijah Mann Jr. (1793–1868) was his brother.

Sources
The New York Civil List compiled by Franklin Benjamin Hough (pages 136, 143, 223 and 290; Weed, Parsons and Co., 1858)
Mann family transcribed from This Green and Pleasant Land, Fairfield, NY by Jane Dieffenbacher, Fairfield Town Historian (1999), at NY Gen Web
The Descendants of Mathew Martine Forde by Scott William Barker (Vol. I; 2011; pg. 90)

1803 births
1860 deaths
Democratic Party New York (state) state senators
Politicians from Utica, New York
People from Fairfield, New York
New York (state) Jacksonians
19th-century American politicians
Democratic Party members of the New York State Assembly